Sir Peter Leslie Gibson (born 10 June 1934), is a former British barrister and Lord Justice of Appeal of the Court of Appeal of England and Wales, and is currently a judge of the Qatar International Court. Gibson has also served, between April 2006 and December 2010, as the UK's Intelligence Services Commissioner, and was appointed by David Cameron in July 2010 to lead the Detainee Inquiry. He is an honorary member of the Society of Legal Scholars.

Education and career
Gibson was educated at Malvern College and graduated from Worcester College, Oxford.

He was called to the Bar by the Inner Temple in 1960, and was knighted and appointed to the High Court of Justice in 1981, serving in the Chancery Division. He served as a judge of the Employment Appeal Tribunal in 1984, and, from 1990 to 1992, as Chairman of the Law Commission for England and Wales. From 1993 until 2005, he was a Lord Justice of Appeal of the Court of Appeal of England and Wales.
In 2006, he was made Intelligence Services Commissioner, with his first term expiring in 2009. On 1 April 2009, he was granted a second term, though Gibson stepped down early, at the end of 2010, in order to chair an inquiry into the UK's alleged role in the torture and other ill-treatment of persons detained during the highly controversial War on Terror. He was succeeded, on 1 January 2011, as ISC by Mark Waller.

Gibson is currently a judge of the Qatar International Court.

Judgments
Wheeler v JJ Saunders Ltd [1994] EWCA Civ 32 - case on nuisance which amended the precedent set by Gillingham Borough Council v Medway (Chatham) Dock Co Ltd.

Detainee Inquiry
On 6 July 2010, Prime Minister David Cameron appointed Gibson to head the Detainee Inquiry, which would look into allegations that the UK intelligence services were complicit in the torture of detainees, including those from the Guantanamo Bay detention camp or subject to rendition flights. Troubled from the outset—Gibson's appointment was questioned by the director of Reprieve, Clive Stafford Smith, almost as soon as it was announced, and human and civil rights and other advocacy groups slammed the inquiry for its lack of independence, impartiality, openness, and its failure to meet the UK's stringent obligations under domestic and international law to comprehensively investigate claims of torture (some groups had such grave misgivings that they threatened to boycott it)—the Detainee Inquiry was eventually scrapped after it reportedly fell into conflict with police investigations.

After a much-criticised delay, the interim report of the Inquiry was finally published on 19 December 2013. It concluded that the British intelligence services had been complicit in extraordinary rendition. It was announced that further investigations would be undertaken by the Parliamentary Intelligence and Security Committee.

Arms

References

External links
 Call for Omagh intelligence probe: Sir Peter Gibson rejected many of Panorama's assertions. The Malvern Gazette, 16 March 2010.

Alumni of Worcester College, Oxford
British barristers
Chancery Division judges
Knights Bachelor
Living people
Lords Justices of Appeal
Members of the Privy Council of the United Kingdom
Members of the Inner Temple
People educated at Malvern College
1934 births
Intelligence Services Commissioners